La Smala is a 1984 French comedy film directed by Jean-Loup Hubert.

Plot 
Simone, a former rocker, is a dedicated homemaker who works in a city of the suburbs of Lyon. She deals especially with Robert, a former virtuoso accordion languishing in unemployment, and his five children. One day, Robert's wife left him to go to live in Paris with a Cop. Desperate, Robert decided to go to the capital to persuade her to come back. Meanwhile, Simone takes a few days of well-deserved vacation, went to Paris to visit her brother. She then finds herself in the same train compartment as Robert, and she discovered stunned on arrival at Lyon that his five children followed him. She must manage all this smala and can happily rely on the hospitality of her brother Pierrot (a transsexual, named now Rita), to take care of all these people. But Simone, who is secretly in love with Robert, will help him in his research and even get the opportunity to record an album with one of his old friends in the music business...

Cast 

 Josiane Balasko as Simone
 Victor Lanoux as Robert
 Dominique Lavanant as Pierrot / Rita
 Maurice Risch as Gégène
 Charles Gérard as Yvon
 Cerise Leclerc as Lulubelle
 Fabrice Samson as Jojo
 Cándida Romero as Lucie
 Hassine Aouichi as Billy
 Mahmoud Zemmouri as Omar Ben Youssef
 Xavier Fultot as Jean-Marie
 Monique Estelle as Jaja
 Hakim Ghanem as Babar
 Thierry Lhermitte as The Sick Cop
 Martin Lamotte as The Monk
 Gilberte Géniat as The Concierge
 Luis Rego as The Internal
 Smaïn as The Fighter
 Perrette Souplex as The Old Lady on the Train
 Rémy Bricka as himself

References

External links 

1984 comedy films
1984 films
French comedy films
1980s French films